Neagra may refer to the following places in Romania:

 Neagra, a village in Dezna Commune, Arad County
 Neagra, a village in Lunca Bradului Commune, Mureș County
 Neagra, a village in Tașca Commune, Neamţ County
 Neagra, a village in the town of Broșteni, Suceava County
 Neagra, the former name of Poiana Vadului Commune, Alba County
 Neagra (Arieș), a tributary of the Arieșul Mare in Alba County
 Neagra, a tributary of the Bâsca Mică in Buzău County
 Neagra, a tributary of the Bicaz in Neamț County
 Neagra (Bistrița), a tributary of the Bistrița in Suceava County
 Neagra Broștenilor, a tributary of the Bistrița in Harghita and Suceava Counties
 Neagra, a tributary of the Mureș in Mureș County

See also 
 Apa Neagră (disambiguation)
 Valea Neagră (disambiguation)